The Campbellton Formation is a geologic formation in New Brunswick. It preserves fossils dating back to the latest Pragian and Emsian of the Devonian period.

Description

The Campbellton Formation is the southernmost representative of the Gaspé Sandstones group and can be divided into 6 facies associations (restricted lacustrine, marginal lacustrine, near-shore lacustrine, coastal-deltaic, sandy to gravelly alluvial plain, and gravelly proximal alluvial environments), and is nearly a kilometer thick. Lacustrine facies are prevalent in the lower parts of the eastern belt (representing a large open lake) while upper parts of the formation are dominated by alluvial facies (representing an eastward-flowing axial braided river system).

Fossil content

Vertebrates

Invertebrates

Plants

See also

 List of fossiliferous stratigraphic units in New Brunswick

References

 

Devonian New Brunswick
Devonian southern paleotemperate deposits